Jack Joseph Eudey (3 January 1906 – 15 August 1977) was an Australian rules footballer who played with North Melbourne in the Victorian Football League (VFL).

Notes

External links 

1906 births
1977 deaths
Australian rules footballers from Ballarat
North Melbourne Football Club players